The 25th District of the Iowa House of Representatives in the state of Iowa.

Current elected officials
Stan Gustafson is the representative currently representing the district.

Past representatives
The district has previously been represented by:
 Warren E. Curtis, 1971–1973
 John E. Patchett, 1973–1981
 George E. Petrick, 1981–1983
 Donald L. Shoultz, 1983–2003
 Robert Osterhaus, 2003–2005
 Tom Schueller, 2005–2011
 Brian Moore, 2011–2013
 Julian Garrett, 2013–2013
 Stan Gustafson, 2013–2023
 Hans Wilz, 2023–present

References

025